Svetlana Jalosjos-de Leon (professionally known as Lana Jalosjos) is a Filipina singer, politician, and former TV host of the longest afternoon running variety show Eat Bulaga!, aired on GMA Network.

Family

She is the daughter of Romeo G. Jalosjos, the previous Congressman of Zamboanga del Norte, and a sister of Bullet Jalosjos, who previously served as Board member and congressman of Zamboanga del Norte. She stayed at the Dakak Beach Resort in Dapitan while managing the singing competition and variety show called G-Idol in Dapitan from 2008 to 2009.

Political career
Jalosjos-de Leon ran for and won as mayor of Baliangao, Misamis Occidental in the 2010 local elections, defeating incumbent mayor Agne V. Yap. She ran for re-election in 2013 facing Yap again but was defeated.

Filmography

Eat Bulaga!-host (2004–2006)
G-Idol-host (2008–2009)

References

Lana
Living people
20th-century Filipino women singers
Women mayors of places in the Philippines
Mayors of places in Misamis Occidental
21st-century Filipino women politicians
21st-century Filipino politicians
Year of birth missing (living people)